In British usage, a lumber room is a room in a house used primarily for storing unused furniture. British stately homes often had more furniture than could be used at one time, and storing the furniture for future use was more common than selling or discarding it.

The first reference to the phrase "lumber room" in the Oxford English Dictionary is the 1740 novel Pamela. Subsequent references can be found in A Christmas Carol by Charles Dickens, Arthur Conan Doyle's 1891 Sherlock Holmes short story "The Five Orange Pips", and The Fellowship of the Ring by J.R.R. Tolkien. A lumber room is described in detail in Saki's short story "The Lumber Room": 
 
The OED mentions in the verb "lumbering" that it first meant to obstruct with pieces of wood to make things from, and then shifted to general obstruction, hence furniture fit the later meaning.

References

Rooms